National Transport Authority may refer to:

 National Transport Authority (Hungary)
 National Transport Authority (Ireland)